Ralph James Quincy Adams (born September 22, 1943) is an author and historian. He is professor of European and British history at Texas A&M University.

Bibliography
Arms and the Wizard: Lloyd George and the Ministry of Munitions, 1915–1916 (1978)
The Conscription Controversy in Great Britain, 1900-18 (1987)
Edwardian Conservatism (1988)
The Great War, 1914-18: Essays on the Military, Political and Social History of the First World War (1990)
British Politics and Foreign Policy in the Age of Appeasement, 1935-39 (1993)
British Appeasement and the Origins of World War II (1994)
Bonar Law (1999)
Europe, Crisis and Conflict: 1890–1945 (2003)
Balfour: The Last Grandee (2007)
"Britain Responds: The Demise of 'Business as Usual'" in Relevance: The Quarterly Journal of the Great War Society (Autumn 1999)
"Andrew Bonar Law and the Fall of the Asquith Coalition: The December 1916 Cabinet Crisis" in The Canadian Journal of History (September 1997)
"Asquith's Choice: Herbert Henry Asquith, the May Coalition and the Conscription Crisis, 1915–1916" in Armed Forces and Society (July 1986).

References

1943 births
Living people
20th-century American historians
American male non-fiction writers
Historians of Europe
American non-fiction writers
Texas A&M University faculty
21st-century American historians
21st-century American male writers
Historians from Indiana
20th-century American male writers

Historians from Texas